X10 is a programming language being developed by IBM at the Thomas J. Watson Research Center as part of the Productive, Easy-to-use, Reliable Computing System (PERCS) project funded by DARPA's High Productivity Computing Systems (HPCS) program.

History
Its primary authors are Kemal Ebcioğlu, Saravanan Arumugam (Aswath), Vijay Saraswat, and Vivek Sarkar.

X10 is designed specifically for parallel computing using the partitioned global address space (PGAS) model.
A computation is divided among a set of places, each of which holds some data and hosts one or more activities that operate on those data.  It has a constrained type system for object-oriented programming, a form of dependent types. Other features include user-defined primitive struct types; globally distributed arrays, and structured and unstructured parallelism.

X10 uses the concept of parent and child relationships for activities to prevent the lock stalemate that can occur when two or more processes wait for each other to finish before they can complete.  An activity may spawn one or more child activities, which may themselves have children.  Children cannot wait for a parent to finish, but a parent can wait for a child using the finish command.

See also
 Chapel
 Coarray Fortran
 Concurrency
 Fortress
 Non-blocking algorithm
 Parallel programming model
 Unified Parallel C

References

External links
 
 Overview of PGAS languages
 Vivek Sarkar's X10 slides
 GPLed X10 prototype

IBM software
Array programming languages
Concurrent programming languages
JVM programming languages